The 1921 Centre vs. Harvard football game was a regular-season college football game played on October 29, 1921, at Harvard Stadium in Allston, Massachusetts. The contest featured the undefeated Centre Praying Colonels, representing Centre College, and the undefeated Harvard Crimson, representing Harvard University. In a rematch of a game played between the two teams the year prior, Centre defeated Harvard in what is widely considered one of the greatest upsets in college football history.

Background

Recent years
After football was played only informally at Harvard in 1917 and 1918 because of World War I, the team returned in 1919 under the leadership of new head coach Bob Fisher. Harvard finished their 1919 season with an undefeated record; they did not allow a point to be scored against them for the first six games of the season, until a 10–10 tie with Princeton. They went on to win the Tournament East-West Football Game against Oregon, 7–6, and were retroactively named the outright national champions by two selectors. The team continued their success in 1920, finishing the season with another undefeated record which was again blemished only by a tie with Princeton. The Crimson were again retroactively selected to a share of the national championship, though this time only by one selector as the majority chose undefeated and untied California instead.

After an undefeated start to the decade in 1910, the Centre College football team fell on hard times and went through a stretch of four years with a losing record from 1912 to 1915. The team rebounded with a 7–1 campaign in 1917, earning shutouts in every win, in coach Charley Moran's first season. Moran had been recruited to the school by Robert L. Myers at the request of Centre president William Arthur Ganfield, and brought with him several players who would go on to be very impactful for Centre, including Bo McMillan, Red Weaver, and Red Roberts. Centre finished the 1919 season undefeated and untied and were retroactively recognized by one selector, Jeff Sagarin, as the season's national champions. They won a further eight games in 1920, capping the season with a 56-point win over TCU in the Fort Worth Classic.

1920 meeting
The teams first met in 1920, at Harvard Stadium in the Boston neighborhood of Allston. Coming into the Centre game, Harvard was also undefeated and unscored upon in the 1920 season.  Meanwhile, Centre College, a tiny school of 300 students in Kentucky, had little history of success in football before their current coach, Charley Moran, and star quarterback, Bo McMillin, arrived on campus in 1917.

The Centre Praying Colonels shocked Harvard in the 1920 game simply by taking a 14–7 halftime lead. But, in the second half, Centre withered before the superior Harvard squad, and Harvard won the game 31–14. Following the game, Harvard's captain offered the game ball to Centre's quarterback Bo McMillin, but McMillin declined the ball and promised "We'll be back next year to take it home with us."

Players and personnel
Harvard, in the third season of Bob Fisher's tenure as head coach, was captained by R. Keith Kane. The starting offensive line for the contest with Centre consisted of left tackle Alexander Ladd, left guard Charles Hubbard, centre Francis Kernan, right guard Fiske Brown, and right tackle Philip Kunhardt. Henry Janin started for the Crimson at left end and Charles Macomber started at right end. Harvard started two halfbacks: Francis Rouillard was on the left, and Vinton Chapin on the right. Erwin Gehrke was the starting fullback and the team's starting quarterback was Frank Johnson.

Centre was led by fifth-year head coach Charley Moran; the team captain was starting right halfback Norris Armstrong. Centre's offensive line was anchored by Ed Kubale at center, with  Ben Cregor and Buck Jones at tackle and guard to his left, and Minos Gordy alongside William Shadoan filling the same positions to his right. Red Roberts started at left end and Bill James was the right end. Terry Snoddy was the left halfback, alongside Armstrong at right halfback, and Hump Tanner was the fullback. The Praying Colonels offense was led by quarterback Bo McMillin.

Game summary
The contest was refereed by R. W. Maxwell. He was assisted by a crew of three other officials: umpire W. R. Crowley, linesman J. J. Tigert, and field judge W. G. Crowell. Entering the contest, sportswriters and pundits gave Harvard 3-to-1 odds to win.

After a scoreless half and early in the third quarter, Red Roberts told McMillin "it's time to score, ride my hump" and McMillin ran for a 32-yard touchdown. He dodged three of Harvard's secondary.

Aftermath
Bob Fisher said after the game "In Bo McMillin Centre has a man who is probably the hardest in the country to stop."

Immediate impact
The phrase by which the game is most commonly known, "C6H0", originated from a comment made by a Centre professor shortly following the game: that Harvard had been "poisoned" by the organic compound with that formula. It stuck, and all around Danville students painted the so-called "impossible formula".

The Centre victory was a shock, but perhaps not a fluke; the team would finish the 1921 season 10–1, defeating several of the nation's powerhouses including VPI, Auburn, Arizona, and Clemson. Their only defeat was a 22–14 loss to powerful Texas A&M in the 1922 Dixie Classic (forerunner of the Cotton Bowl), in Dallas, Texas, on January 2, 1922 (the game where A&M's famous "12th man" was born). Bo McMillin got married in Dallas the day before the game, and the Colonels were in the midst of a grueling long distance trip from home by train, having played Arizona in San Diego, California, the week before. Up until their final game of the season the Colonels outscored their opponents by a margin of 314 to 6.

"Greatest Upset"
In 1950, the Associated Press named C6H0 the greatest sports upset of the first half of the 20th century. In 2005, The New York Times called it "arguably the upset of the century in college football." In 2006, ESPN named it the third-biggest upset in the 138-year history of college football, and was ranked No. 4 in a similar list published by Bleacher Report in 2011. The game also ranked No. 126 on an ESPN list of the 150 greatest college football games of all time, released in 2019.

On the 75th anniversary of C6H0, Centre challenged Harvard to a rematch. Harvard declined.

See also
List of historically significant college football games

References

Bibliography

1921 college football season
1920s in Boston
vs. Harvard 1921
vs. Centre 1921
October 1921 sports events
1921 in sports in Massachusetts
Sports competitions in Boston